Lasionycta calberlai is a moth of the family Noctuidae. It is found in France
, Switzerland, Italy and Slovenia.

Description
The wingspan is 21–25 mm.Warren (1914) states calberlai Stgr. (17 e). Forewing dull greyish fuscous, with a faint brown tinge; median area darker; a short black streak from base below cell; claviform stigma black-edged, continued as a black streak to outer line; upper stigmata of the ground colour, with paler rims; the cell brown black; submarginalline pale grey, not dentate; hindwing greyish fuscous. A small and obscure species confined to the Tyrol and the Campagna, Italy. Larva grey brown, darker on dorsum and between the segments; dorsalline pale, interrupted, with dark margins; lateral line white; spiracles black with white rings; feeds on Clematis vitalba.
.

Biology

The larvae feed on Clematis vitalba.

References

External links
Moths and Butterflies of Europe and North Africa
Lepiforum.de

Lasionycta
Moths of Europe
Moths described in 1883